Crowley, California may refer to:
Crowley, Mendocino County, California
Crowley, Tulare County, California